Alessandro Nesta  (born 19 March 1976) is an Italian professional football manager and former player. Usually deployed as a centre-back, he is widely considered one of the best defenders of all time. He was best known for his pace, artistic tackles, elegance on the ball, distribution and tight marking of opponents.

He made over 400 Serie A appearances in a 20-year career spread between Lazio and AC Milan, winning domestic and European honours with both clubs. Later in his career, he played in Major League Soccer (MLS) for the Montreal Impact, and for Chennaiyin of the Indian Super League. Nesta is a four-time Serie A Defender of the Year and a four-time member of the annual UEFA Team of the Year. In 2004, he was named as one of the Top 100 greatest living footballers as part of FIFA's 100th anniversary celebration. In 2021, he was inducted into the Italian Football Hall of Fame.

Nesta was a member of the Italy national team for a decade from his debut in 1996, earning 78 caps in total. At international level, he competed at the 1996 Olympics, three UEFA European Championships, and three FIFA World Cups. Nesta was a member of the Italian team that won the 2006 World Cup, and he also represented the Italian side that reached the final of Euro 2000.

Club career

Lazio

Nesta was first discovered by Francesco Rocca, a scout for Roma, but his father, a Lazio fan, turned down the offer. He began his youth career with Lazio in 1985, playing in various roles, including as a striker and midfielder, before being placed in the role of a defender. In the 1993–94 season he was called up to the first team, and on 13 March 1994 he made his debut in a 2–2 away draw against Udinese; Nesta came on for Pierluigi Casiraghi during the 78th minute.

He assumed the team captaincy in 1997 under Sven-Göran Eriksson, and helped Lazio win the 1998 Coppa Italia against AC Milan in the final, in which he scored the winning goal. He would also make the UEFA Cup Final that season, losing out to Internazionale. Nesta was awarded the Serie A Young Footballer of the Year Award at the 1998 Italian footballing awards for his performance throughout the season.

The following year he was forced to stay out for nearly half the season due to ligament injuries suffered during the 1998 FIFA World Cup. He returned to the field in December, and, as captain, led Lazio in the title race, lost by a single point on the final day of the season. He did, however, win the first two trophies at the international level of his team: the UEFA Cup Winners' Cup, won against Mallorca, and, in August, the European Super Cup over Manchester United.

In the 1999–2000 season he led Lazio to the Scudetto and Coppa Italia, winning the double. During the 2000–01 season, under Dino Zoff, Lazio won the Supercoppa Italiana and finished third in Serie A. Nesta's performances and success for Lazio during this period earned him three consecutive Serie A Defender of the Year awards between 2000 and 2002. Financial problems for Lazio and its then-president Sergio Cragnotti led to the sale of Nesta to Milan in 2002. Nesta left the club with a backlog salary of €2 million, half of which were converted into shares of the Biancocelesti club.

AC Milan

Just before the 2002–03 Serie A campaign, financial woes forced Lazio to sell many of their best players, including Nesta, who transferred to Milan for €30,987,000 (60 billion lire). During this time, he would form a formidable defensive line alongside Paolo Maldini, Cafu, Alessandro Costacurta and Jaap Stam, among others. Nesta's first two seasons with the Rossoneri were very successful. During the 2002–03 season, he won the Champions League for the first time in his career as Milan defeated rivals Juventus at Old Trafford in the first all-Italian Champions League final in history. Nesta helped Milan keep a clean sheet during the match, which went to a penalty shootout following a 0–0 deadlock after extra time. Nesta was able to score his penalty kick as Milan won the shootout 3–2. Nesta also won the Coppa Italia over Roma during his first season at the club, while Milan finished third in Serie A that season. Nesta was once again awarded the Serie A Defender of the Year award for his performances, and was elected to be part of the UEFA Team of the Year.

The following season, Milan lost both the 2003 Supercoppa Italiana to Juventus and the Intercontinental Cup final to Boca Juniors, on penalties. Nesta managed to win the European Super Cup with Milan against Porto, however, and captured his second Scudetto that season, during which Milan set an Italian record for points won. Milan were eliminated in the quarter-finals of the Champions League, and in the semi-finals of the Coppa Italia, to eventual winners Lazio, although Nesta managed to score a goal in the quarter-final match against Roma. Nesta was once again elected to be part of the UEFA Team of the Year, for the third consecutive season.

Nesta began the next season by defeating his former team Lazio to capture the 2004 Supercoppa Italiana. Milan also reached the Champion's League final in 2005, losing to Liverpool on penalties, while in Serie A, they finished behind champions Juventus. Despite finishing second in both Serie A and the Champions League, Nesta was elected to the 2005 FIFPro World XI for the first time in his career, for his performances.

During the 2005–06 A.C. Milan season, Milan once again finished behind Juventus in Serie A, although both Juventus and Milan were later deducted points for being involved in the 2006 matchfixing scandal, and the title was awarded to Internazionale; Juventus were relegated while Milan finishing in third place after the point deduction. Milan also reached the semi-finals of the Champions League in 2006, losing out to eventual champions Barcelona, while they were eliminated in the quarter-finals of the Coppa Italia.

Despite missing most of the 2006–07 season due to a shoulder injury, Nesta played a vital part in Milan's return to the 2007 Champions League final, where Milan avenged their 2005 final loss, defeating Liverpool 2–1 in Athens. Despite Milan's point deduction during the season, Nesta was also able to return from injury in time to help Milan manage a fourth-place finish in Serie A, clinching the final Champions League spot. Nesta was elected to be part of both the UEFA Team of the Year and the FIFPro World XI for his performances that season.

Nesta won his third European Super Cup in August 2007 when Milan defeated Sevilla 3–1. Nesta signed a contract extension that would keep him at Milan until 2011. Nesta went on to score his first goal for Milan since April 2006 in a 1–1 draw with Siena on 15 September 2007. He followed this up with an important goal for Milan in the 4–2 victory over Boca Juniors in the final of the 2007 FIFA Club World Cup. Milan would disappoint throughout the rest of the season, however, finishing fifth in Serie A and being eliminated in the round of 16 of the UEFA Champions League and the Coppa Italia.

Serious back injuries forced Nesta out of action for the whole 2008–09 season, which raised concerns about his chances to make a comeback into active football. He fully recovered from his injuries and came on as 77th-minute substitute in Milan's final Serie A away match to Fiorentina on 31 May 2009 for his first competitive appearance of the season. Milan finished the domestic season in third place.

The following season Nesta scored his first brace for Milan in a 2–1 victory over Chievo in the Serie A. He began to re-emerge as a starter for the club and was one of Milan's most consistent players throughout the entire 2009–10 season under Leonardo. Nesta continued his excellent partnership with fellow centerback Thiago Silva throughout the 2010–11 season under Massimiliano Allegri, forming a formidable defensive pairing, conceding just 24 goals in 38 games during Milan's victorious Serie A campaign. Milan also managed to reach the semi-finals of the Coppa Italia, but were once again disappointingly eliminated in the round of 16 of the Champions League. Throughout the 2010–11 season, speculation indicated that Nesta would retire at the end of the season. However, he later confirmed that he wanted to play one more season at Milan before retiring and signed a contract extension on 18 May 2011, which kept him on Milan's squad until summer 2012. Nesta was elected to be part of the Serie A Team of the Year for his performances during Milan's successful title run that season.

Nesta began his final season with Milan by winning the 2011 Supercoppa Italiana on 6 August 2011, defeating city rivals Internazionale 2–1 in Beijing. Milan finished second to Juventus in Serie A that season, and were eliminated in the semi-finals of the Coppa Italia and the quarter-finals of the Champions League. On 10 May, during a press conference, Nesta announced his retirement from Serie A at the end of the season. During his ten seasons at the Milanese club, Nesta collected 325 caps, scoring 10 goals. With Milan, he won two Serie A titles, a Coppa Italia, two Supercoppa Italiana, two Champions Leagues, two UEFA Super Cups and a FIFA Club World Cup.

Montreal Impact

On 5 July 2012, Nesta signed a contract with the Montreal Impact of Major League Soccer (MLS). He signed an 18-month contract on a free transfer. The club also stated he would not be signed as a designated player. Nesta made his Impact debut against Lyon in a friendly match on 24 July. He made his competitive debut three days later, in a 3–1 home win over the New York Red Bulls. In 2013, Nesta won his first and only title with Montreal Impact: the Canadian Championship.

On 20 October 2013, Nesta announced that he would be retiring at the conclusion of the 2013 MLS Cup Playoffs after playing parts of two seasons with the Impact.

Chennaiyin
On 28 November 2014, it was announced that Nesta had signed for Chennaiyin FC of the Indian Super League for the remainder of the 2014 season. He was signed by Marco Materazzi, his former international defensive partner. He made his debut on 9 December in a 2–2 draw against Delhi Dynamos, partnering Mikaël Silvestre in central defence in Chennaiyin's last match of a regular season in which they topped the league.

International career
Nesta began his career for Italy and was a member of the under-21 squad that won the 1996 UEFA European Under-21 Football Championship; in the final against Spain, following a 1–1 draw, he took Italy's fourth penalty in an eventual 4–2 shoot-out victory. A few months later, he was named to Italy's UEFA Euro 1996 squad in England by Arrigo Sacchi, but did not come off the bench as Italy were eliminated in the group stage by eventual finalists Germany and the Czech Republic. He earned his first cap for the Azzurri under Cesare Maldini in a qualifier for the 1998 FIFA World Cup against Moldova on 5 October 1996 and eventually made seven appearances in the qualifying campaign. At the final tournament, Nesta played in all three group games, playing alongside Paolo Maldini, Fabio Cannavaro, Alessandro Costacurta and Giuseppe Bergomi, helping Italy keep a clean sheet against Cameroon. He made no further appearances due to injury, however, as Italy were eliminated by the hosts and eventual champions France on penalties in the quarter-finals.

After featuring in defence for Italy during the Euro 2000 qualifying campaign under Dino Zoff, Nesta featured in the Italian starting lineup at Euro 2000, partnering with Paolo Maldini and Fabio Cannavaro in defence throughout most of the tournament. Italy only conceded two goals en route to the final, and kept three clean sheets throughout the tournament; the first coming against co-hosts Belgium in the group stage, and the second against Romania in the quarter-finals, in which he was named man of the match. In the semi-final, a ten-man Italy overcame co-hosts the Netherlands in a penalty shootout, after a 0–0 deadlock following extra time. Italy advanced to the final where they faced defending World Cup Champions France. Following a goal by Marco Delvecchio in the 55th minute, Italy led the match 1–0 until the final minute of stoppage time, when Sylvain Wiltord scored the equaliser. David Trezeguet then scored the golden goal in extra time for France to defeat the Italians in the second consecutive tournament, as the Italians finished the Euro as runners-up. Nesta, along with his defensive partners Maldini and Cannavaro, was elected to be part of the team of the tournament for his performances.

After Euro 2000, Nesta's remained a first-choice centre back for Italy under new manager Giovanni Trapattoni, featuring extensively during the 2002 World Cup qualifying campaign. During the 2002 World Cup, he partnered Fabio Cannavaro in central defence, keeping a clean sheet in the opening win against Ecuador, but once again, injury kept him from playing in the second round, and Nesta did not feature in the controversial second round defeat to co-hosts South Korea. Nesta featured prominently as Italy topped their Euro 2004 qualifying group. Italy's disappointment at major tournaments continued at Euro 2004, however, where they were eliminated in the first round following a three-way five-point tie with Denmark and Sweden, only to be eliminated on direct encounters. Nesta managed to stay injury free and played for a full 90 minutes in all three group games, helping Italy to keep a clean sheet in the opening draw against Denmark.

Following two successive disappointments, newly appointed manager Marcello Lippi kept Nesta in the starting lineup as Italy topped their qualification group en route to the 2006 World Cup. Despite starting the final tournament strongly, helping Italy to keep a clean sheet in their opening win over Ghana, the World Cup turned out to be a personal disappointment for Nesta, as an injury in the final group game against the Czech Republic, which Italy won 2–0, put him on the sidelines while Italy went on to win the trophy. After the World Cup, Nesta made one appearance in the Euro 2008 qualifiers, in a 3–1 away win against Georgia on 11 October 2006, but continuous injuries forced him to retire from the international team. Prior to the final tournament, Nesta declined Roberto Donadoni's invitation to return to the national team. Two years later, he similarly turned down an invitation from Marcello Lippi prior to the 2010 World Cup. In total he made 78 appearances for Italy.

Managerial career

Miami
On 31 August 2015, Nesta was introduced as the first head coach of the newly formed Miami FC, which began play in the North American Soccer League (NASL) in April 2016. After finishing a combined 7th place in his first season, Miami FC finished in first place in his second, as Spring and Fall champions of the 2017 NASL season. However, the team were defeated in the season playoffs semifinal round to the New York Cosmos following a 6–5 loss in penalty shootout after a goalless draw. He resigned as coach following the completion of the 2017 season, on 17 November.

Perugia
On 14 May 2018, Nesta was appointed manager of Perugia. After a 4–1 loss to Verona in the 2018–19 Serie B promotion playoffs, Nesta parted with Perugia on 21 May 2019.

Frosinone
On 17 June 2019, Nesta was appointed manager of Frosinone on a two-year contract. The team finished the 2019–20 Serie B season in 8th, just making it into the playoffs. They lost the playoff final to Spezia after a 1–1 aggregate draw, as the opponents had performed better in the regular season. On 22 March 2021, Nesta was sacked.

Style of play

Nesta was a complete and dominant defender, who was influential both at club and international level, and who is regarded by pundits as being one of the greatest and most talented defenders both of his generation, and of all time. Despite being a strong and imposing defensive, athletic and physical presence, he was also an extremely agile and elegant player, with excellent balance, ball skills, vision and passing ability for a defender, which allowed him to bring the ball out of the defence and start plays from the back after winning back possession; these abilities led him to be compared to former Milan captain Franco Baresi. Although he was usually deployed as a centreback during his career, he initially started out as a right-sided full back; his technical skills, athleticism and defensive ability made him a versatile player from a tactical standpoint, who was capable of playing anywhere along the backline, and also allowed him to be deployed on the left, or even as a sweeper on occasion. Nesta was also excellent in the air, and was unusually quick for a centreback; he often stood out throughout his career for his pace, acceleration, and stamina.

In addition to his class, as well as his technical and physical abilities, Nesta also possessed an excellent positional and tactical sense, as well as an acute capacity to read the game, which enabled him to anticipate and close down opponents in one on one situations, and prevent attacking plays; his defensive intelligence enabled him to maintain a consistently high level of performance even towards the end of his career, as he lost his pace and stamina. Due to his ability to lead from the back and organise his teammates, he excelled in a zonal marking system, but was also known for his tight marking of opposing players. An accurate and tenacious ball-winner, he was known for his artistic sliding tackles, acrobatic clearances, and ability to time his challenges well. Despite his talent, Nesta's career suffered from the many injuries he encountered, which hindered him from playing in the knockout stages at each of the three World Cups at which he participated.

Personal life
On 7 May 2007, Nesta married his fiancée, Gabriela Pagnozzi, in a civil ceremony in Milan; the religious ceremony followed on 30 May 2007. Gabriela was working for Casa Italia, the Italy national team headquarters, during the 1998 World Cup. Their relationship was born when she tended to him following his injury against Austria. "I can say, I got the injury and her in France then. And the injury has gone, [but] she has stayed with me." Their daughter, Sofia, was born on 19 October 2006, and on 20 March 2008, their son Tommaso was born. His nephew Gian Marco Nesta is also a professional footballer.

Media
Nesta appeared in the 1998 Italian film Paparazzi, directed by Neri Parenti. He was also on the cover of the Italian edition of SCEE's This is Football 2002. Nesta features in EA Sports' FIFA football video game series; he's been included as an Ultimate Team Legend/Icon since FIFA 16.

Career statistics

Club

International

Managerial statistics

Honours

Player
Lazio
 Serie A: 1999–2000
 Coppa Italia: 1997–98, 1999–2000
 Supercoppa Italiana: 2000
 UEFA Cup Winners' Cup: 1998–99
 UEFA Super Cup: 1999

AC Milan
 Serie A: 2003–04, 2010–11
 Coppa Italia: 2002–03
 Supercoppa Italiana: 2004, 2011
 UEFA Champions League: 2002–03, 2006–07
 UEFA Super Cup: 2003, 2007
 FIFA Club World Cup: 2007

Montreal Impact
 Canadian Championship: 2013

Italy U-21
 UEFA Under-21 European Championship: 1996

Italy
 FIFA World Cup: 2006

Individual
Serie A Young Footballer of the Year: 1998
Serie A Defender of the Year: 2000, 2001, 2002, 2003
Serie A Team of the Year: 2010–11
UEFA Euro Team of the Tournament: 2000UEFA Team of the Year: 2002, 2003, 2004, 2007
ESM Team of the Year: 2000–01
FIFPro World XI: 2005, 2007
FIFA 100
UEFA Golden Jubilee Poll: #47
AC Milan Hall of Fame
All-time UEFA European Under-21 Championship dream team: 2015
UEFA Ultimate Team of the Year (published 2015)
Italian Football Hall of Fame: 2021

Orders
 5th Class / Knight: Cavaliere Ordine al Merito della Repubblica Italiana: 2000

 4th Class / Officer: Ufficiale Ordine al Merito della Repubblica Italiana: 2006

 CONI: Golden Collar of Sports Merit: 2006

ManagerMiami'''
 North American Soccer League: 2017 Spring/Fall champions

References

External links

 
 Profile at LegaSerieA.it 
 
 
 Profile at Italia1910.com 
 FootballDatabase.com provides Nesta's profile and stats

1976 births
Living people
Footballers from Rome
Italian footballers
Association football central defenders
S.S. Lazio players
A.C. Milan players
CF Montréal players
Chennaiyin FC players
Serie A players
Major League Soccer players
Indian Super League players
UEFA Champions League winning players
Italian expatriate footballers
Italian expatriate sportspeople in Canada
Italian expatriate sportspeople in India
Expatriate soccer players in Canada
Expatriate footballers in India
Italy under-21 international footballers
Olympic footballers of Italy
Italy international footballers
UEFA Euro 1996 players
Footballers at the 1996 Summer Olympics
1998 FIFA World Cup players
UEFA Euro 2000 players
2002 FIFA World Cup players
UEFA Euro 2004 players
2006 FIFA World Cup players
FIFA World Cup-winning players
FIFA 100
Italian football managers
Miami FC coaches
A.C. Perugia Calcio managers
Frosinone Calcio managers
USL Championship coaches
Serie B managers
Italian expatriate football managers
Italian expatriate sportspeople in the United States
Expatriate soccer managers in the United States
Officers of the Order of Merit of the Italian Republic
Knights of the Order of Merit of the Italian Republic